Zhenzhu may refer to:

Zhenzhu Khan (died 645), khagan of Xueyantuo
Zhenzhu Yabgu (died 659), claimant to the throne of Western Turkic Khaganate
Zhenzhu Subdistrict, Zhen'an District, Dandong, Liaoning, China
Zhen Zhu, a variety of the ornamental aquarium fish flowerhorn cichlid
Hua Xiren, a character from the Chinese novel Dream of the Red Chamber, originally named Zhenzhu (or Hua Zhenzhu)